"The Enchanted Canary" is a French fairy tale collected by Charles Deulin in Contes du roi Cambrinus (1874) under the title of Désiré d'Amour. Andrew Lang included it in The Red Fairy Book.

Synopsis
A lord was the fattest lord in Flanders. He loved his son dearly. One day, the young man told him he did not find the women in Flanders beautiful; he did not wish to marry a woman who was pink and white, because he did not find them beautiful. Then, they received a basket of oranges, which they had never seen before, and ate them. The son dreamed of an orchard with trees of such "golden apples", which held a princess with golden skin. He set out to find it and marry her.

At night, he stopped at a little hut. There, an old man told him that in a nearby forest was a park, which held a castle, and the orange grove behind it. A witch lived in the castle. He should oil the hinges, feed the dog a loaf of bread, give a baking woman a brush, and take the cord out of a well. Then he should get three oranges and return without touching the oranges until he reached water. Then, each one would be a princess and he could marry whichever one he loved. But having made his choice, he must never leave her.

He obeyed. He heard the witch calling after him, to the things to kill him, but the rope refused because he had kept it from rotting, and so on with the others. But once he escaped, he could not find water, and he opened an orange in hopes of juice. A canary flew out and flew off to find water. Despite himself, he tried a second, and the same thing happened; he fell unconscious. Nighttime revived him, and he reached a stream. There he opened the third, and when the third canary flew out, he gave it water. It became a beautiful princess.

He brought her back, but refused to take her to the castle afoot.  He went ahead to get a carriage and horses. She heard a noise while he was gone and climbed a tree for fear it was a wolf. It was an ugly maidservant who saw the princess' reflection in the pool and took it for her own. She thought she was too beautiful to carry water. She was sent back twice, and the third time, she realized that the reflection was someone else. She spoke to the princess and heard her story. Sticking a pin into her head, the maidservant turned the princess back into a canary. She then told the young man, when he returned, that she had been turned into this. The young man blamed himself.

At the wedding feast, the canary appeared in the kitchen window and enchanted the person cooking the goose, three times, so that each time it burned. The third time, the scullion caught it, and was going to wring its neck, when the lord came down to see what had happened. The lord thought the canary lovely and stroked it, which made him find the pin. He pulled it out, and the princess was unenchanted.

The maidservant was condemned to death, but the princess obtained her pardon, and she went back to work as a maidservant. The princess and the young man married.

See also
Lovely Ilonka
Nix Nought Nothing
Prunella
The Lassie and Her Godmother
The Little Girl Sold with the Pears
The Love for Three Oranges
The Magic Swan Geese
The Two Caskets
The Water of Life
The Witch

References

External links
The Enchanted Canary
 Original French edition on Gallica (BNF)

Animal tales
Fictional princesses
Fictional canaries
French fairy tales
Fiction about shapeshifting
Gascony
Witchcraft in fairy tales